Transistor is the seventh studio album by the Norwegian hard rock band TNT. While it kept the alternative feel of Firefly, it was more successful than Firefly, with the song "Just Like God" receiving some radioplay at US College radio stations.

Track listing

"Just Like God" is not included on the Japanese edition.

Personnel

Band
Tony Harnell – vocals
Ronni Le Tekrø – guitars, backing vocals on "Free Again"
Morty Black – bass guitar, backing vocals on "Free Again"

Associated members
 Dag Stokke – keyboards
 Frode Lamøy – drums, percussion

Additional personnel
Embee Normann – background vocals on "Under My Pillow"
Eli Kristin Hagen – background vocals on "Into Pieces"

Album credits
Ken Ingwersen – producer, mixing
Dag Stokke – engineer
Tina Norris - cover model

Fan and media reception
The album was met with mixed reviews amongst fans and reviewers alike. It was given max score in Oppland Arbeiderblad while bigger tabloid newspapers in Norway give it a 4 out of 6. The fanbase was, like Firefly, almost split in half while one group did not like this new experimental side of TNT while the other group approached with open arms. Morty Black stated in an interview that Transistor was the natural progression from Firefly. The album is still controversial today but keeps growing on the fanbase and is now accepted as an important part of TNT history. Tony Harnell's solid effort on Transistor is widely known to be one of the strongest vocal performances he did for TNT.

References

External links
http://www.ronniletekro.com/discography-album-15.html

1999 albums
TNT (Norwegian band) albums
Spitfire Records albums